This is a list of United Nations Security Council Resolutions 201 to 300 adopted between 19 March 1965 and 12 October 1971.

See also 
 Lists of United Nations Security Council resolutions
 List of United Nations Security Council Resolutions 101 to 200
 List of United Nations Security Council Resolutions 301 to 400

0201